The Atari ST character set is the character set of the Atari ST personal computer family including the Atari STE, TT and Falcon. It is based on code page 437, the original character set of the IBM PC, and like that set includes ASCII codes 32–126, extended codes for accented letters (diacritics), and other symbols. It differs from code page 437 in using other dingbats at code points 0–31, in exchanging the box-drawing characters 176–223 for the Hebrew alphabet and other symbols, and exchanging code points 158, 236 and 254–255 with the symbols for sharp S, line integral, cubed and macron.

The Atari ST family of computers contained this font stored in ROM in three sizes; as an 8×16 pixels-per-character font used in the high-resolution graphics modes, as an 8×8 pixels-per-character font used in the low- and medium-resolution graphics modes, and as a 6×6 pixels-per-character font used for icon labels in any graphics mode.

All 256 codes were assigned a graphical character in ROM, including the codes from 0 to 31 that in ASCII were reserved for non-graphical control characters.

Digital Research's Intel-based original GEM for IBM compatible PCs utilized the similar GEM character set. It has swapped ¢ and ø and has also swapped ¥ and Ø (meaning GEM is more similar to code page 865 by placement of Ø and ø). It also has the currency sign (¤) at codepoint 158, “ at codepoint 169, ” at codepoint 170, ‹ at codepoint 171, › at codepoint 172, section sign (§) at codepoint 184, double dagger (‡) at codepoint 185, „ at codepoint 192, horizontal ellipsis (…) codepoint 193, per mille sign (‰) at codepoint 194, bullet (•) at codepoint 195, en dash (–) at codepoint 196, em dash (—) at codepoint 197, degree sign (°) at code point 198, the S with caron (uppercase and lowercase) and various uppercase Latin accented letters (in codepoint order, they are Á, Â, È, Ê, Ë, Ì, Í, Î, Ï, Ò, Ó, Ô, Š, š, Ù, Ú, Û, and Ÿ) at codepoints 199-216, sharp s (ß) at codepoint 217, various spaces at codepoints 218-223, bullet operator (∙) at codepoint 249, black square (■) at codepoint 254 (as in code page 437), empty set (∅) at code point 255, GEM-specific characters at codepoints 5, 6, and 7, various black triangles (in codepoint order, they are ▴, ▾, ▸, ◂, ►, ◄) at codepoints 12-17 (codepoints 16 and 17 match code page 437), ⧓ at codepoint 18, ▂ at codepoint 19, ¶ (which is not filled in the system font) at codepoint 20, § (duplicate) at codepoint 21, ↕ at codepoint 22, ↨ at code point 23, and codepoints 24-31 match code page 437.

Character set
The following table shows the Atari ST character set. Each character is shown with a potential Unicode equivalent if available. Differences from code page 437 are shown boxed.

Although the ROM provides a graphic for all 256 different possible 8-bit codes, some APIs will not print some of these code points, in particular the range 0–31 and the code at 127. Instead they will interpret them as control characters.

Alt codes 
Using the Alt Numpad input method, users can enter a character by holding down the Alt key and entering the three-digit decimal code point on the Numpad. This provides a way to enter special characters not provided directly on the keyboard.

Euro variants 
The Atari ST character set long pre-dates the introduction of the euro currency and thus does not provide a code point for the euro sign (U+20AC, €). However, some software (such as Calamus) utilized code point 238 (0xEE) for this purpose. This code point is normally assigned to the mathematical element-of sign (U+2208, ∈), and to the Greek lowercase epsilon (U+03B5, ε) in code page 437.
Alternatively, the rarely used logical conjunction sign (U+2227, ∧) at code point 222 (0xDE) could be replaced by the euro sign.

See also 
 GEM character set
 ATASCII
 Western Latin character sets (computing)
 Bitstream International Character Set

References 

Character sets
Computer-related introductions in 1985
Character set